Royalton is an unincorporated community in northern Amanda Township, Fairfield County, Ohio, United States.

History
Royalton was laid out in 1810. An early variant name was Tobytown. A post office was established at Royalton in 1818, and remained in operation until 1909.

Geography
The village lies at the intersection of Royalton and Amanda-Northern Roads. The nearest body of running water is a small creek, which eventually empties into the Hocking River.

References

Unincorporated communities in Fairfield County, Ohio
Unincorporated communities in Ohio